Plato (428/427 or 424/423 – 348/347 BC) was an ancient Greek philosopher born in Athens during the Classical period in Ancient Greece. In Athens, Plato founded the Academy, a philosophical school where he taught the philosophical doctrines that would later became known as Platonism. Plato (or Platon) was a pen name derived from his nickname given to him by his wrestling coach – allegedly a reference to his physical broadness. According to Alexander of Miletus quoted by Diogenes of Sinope his actual name was Aristocles, son of Ariston, of the deme Collytus (Collytus being a district of Athens).

Plato was an innovator of the written dialogue and dialectic forms in philosophy. He raised problems for what later became all the major areas of both theoretical philosophy and practical philosophy. His most famous contribution is the Theory of forms, where he presents a solution to the problem of universals. He is also the namesake of Platonic love and the Platonic solids.

His own most decisive philosophical influences are usually thought to have been, along with Socrates, the pre-Socratics Pythagoras, Heraclitus and Parmenides, although few of his predecessors' works remain extant and much of what we know about these figures today derives from Plato himself. 

Along with his teacher, Socrates, and his student, Aristotle, Plato is a central figure in the history of philosophy. Unlike the work of nearly all of his contemporaries, Plato's entire body of work is believed to have survived intact for over 2,400 years. Although their popularity has fluctuated, Plato's works have consistently been read and studied. Through Neoplatonism Plato also greatly influenced both Christian and Islamic philosophy (through e.g. Al-Farabi). In modern times, Alfred North Whitehead famously said: "the safest general characterization of the European philosophical tradition is that it consists of a series of footnotes to Plato."

Biography 

Little is known about Plato's early life and education. He belonged to an aristocratic and influential family. The exact time and place of Plato's birth are unknown. Based on ancient sources, most modern scholars believe that he was born in Athens or Aegina, between 428 and 423 BC. Plato gives little biographical information about himself in his works, but often referred some of his relatives with a great degree of precision, including his brothers Adeimantus and Glaucon, who debate with Socrates in the Republic. These and other references enable us to reconstruct Plato's family tree. Plato may have travelled in Italy, Sicily, Egypt, and Cyrene, but at the age of forty, Plato founded a school of philosophy in Athens, the Academy, on a plot of land in the Grove of Hecademus or Academus, named after Academus, an Attic hero in Greek mythology. The  operated until it was destroyed by Lucius Cornelius Sulla in 84 BC. According to Diogenes Laërtius, throughout his later life, Plato became entangled with the politics of the city of Syracuse, where attempted to replace the tyrant Dionysius, with Dionysius's brother-in-law, Dion of Syracuse, who Plato had recruited as one of his followers, but the tyrant himself turned against Plato. After Dionysius's death, according to Plato's Seventh Letter, Dion requested Plato return to Syracuse to tutor Dionysius II, who seemed to accept Plato's teachings, but eventually became suspicious of their motives, expelling Dion and holding Plato against his will. Eventually Plato left Syracuse. and Dion would return to overthrow Dionysius and rule Syracuse, before being usurped by Calippus, a fellow disciple of Plato. A variety of sources have given accounts of Plato's death. One story, based on a mutilated manuscript, suggests Plato died in his bed, whilst a young Thracian girl played the flute to him. Another tradition suggests Plato died at a wedding feast. The account is based on Diogenes Laërtius's reference to an account by Hermippus, a third-century Alexandrian. According to Tertullian, Plato simply died in his sleep.

Name 
The fact that the philosopher in his maturity called himself Platon is indisputable, but the origin of this name remains mysterious. Platon is a nickname from the adjective platýs 'broad'. Although Platon was a fairly common name (31 instances are known from Athens alone), the name does not occur in Plato's known family line. The sources of Diogenes Laërtius account for this by claiming that his wrestling coach, Ariston of Argos, dubbed him "broad" on account of his chest and shoulders, or that Plato derived his name from the breadth of his eloquence, or his wide forehead. While recalling a moral lesson about frugal living Seneca mentions the meaning of Plato's name: "His very name was given him because of his broad chest." According to Diogenes Laërtius, his birth name was supposedly Aristocles, meaning 'best reputation'., however modern scholars are divided on the reliability of this claim.

Influences

Socrates 

Plato never speaks in his own voice in his dialogues; every dialogue except the Laws features Socrates, although many dialogues, including the Timaeus and Statesman, feature him speaking only rarely. Leo Strauss notes that Socrates' reputation for irony casts doubt on whether Plato's Socrates is expressing sincere beliefs. Xenophon's Memorabilia and Aristophanes's The Clouds seem to present a somewhat different portrait of Socrates from the one Plato paints. Aristotle attributes a different doctrine with respect to Forms to Plato and Socrates. Aristotle suggests that Socrates' idea of forms can be discovered through investigation of the natural world, unlike Plato's Forms that exist beyond and outside the ordinary range of human understanding. The Socratic problem concerns how to reconcile these various accounts.  The precise relationship between Plato and Socrates remains an area of contention among scholars.

Pythagoreanism 

Although Socrates influenced Plato directly, the influence of Pythagoras, or in a broader sense, the Pythagoreans, such as Archytas also appears to have been significant. Aristotle and Cicero both claimed that the philosophy of Plato closely followed the teachings of the Pythagoreans. According to R. M. Hare, this influence consists of three points:
The platonic Republic might be related to the idea of "a tightly organized community of like-minded thinkers", like the one established by Pythagoras in Croton.
The idea that mathematics and, generally speaking, abstract thinking is a secure basis for philosophical thinking as well as "for substantial theses in science and morals".
They shared a "mystical approach to the soul and its place in the material world".

Pythagoras held that all things are number, and the cosmos comes from numerical principles. He introduced the concept of form as distinct from matter, and that the physical world is an imitation of an eternal mathematical world. These ideas were very influential on Heraclitus, Parmenides and Plato.

Heraclitus and Parmenides 

The two philosophers Heraclitus and Parmenides, influenced by earlier  pre-Socratic Greek philosophers such as Pythagoras and Xenophanes, departed from mythological explanations for the universe and began the metaphysical tradition that strongly influenced Plato and continues today.  Heraclitus viewed all things as continuously changing, that one cannot "step into the same river twice" due to the ever-changing waters flowing through it, and the all things exist as a contraposition of opposites. According to  Diogenes Laërtius, Plato received these ideas through Heraclitus' disciple Cratylus. Parmenides adopted an altogether contrary vision, arguing for the idea of a changeless, eternal universe and the view that change is an illusion. Plato's most self-critical dialogue is the Parmenides, which features Parmenides and his student Zeno, which criticizes Plato's own metaphysical theories. Plato's Sophist dialogue includes an Eleatic stranger. These ideas about change and permanence, or becoming and Being, influenced Plato in formulating his theory of Forms.

Philosophy 

In Plato's dialogues, Socrates and his company of disputants had something to say on many subjects, including several aspects of metaphysics. These include religion and science, human nature, love, and sexuality. More than one dialogue contrasts perception and reality, nature and custom, and body and soul. Francis Cornford identified the "twin pillars of Platonism" as the theory of Forms, on the one hand, and, on the other hand, the doctrine of immortality of the soul.

The Forms 

In the dialogues Socrates regularly asks for the meaning of a general term (e. g. justice, truth, beauty), and criticizes those who instead give him particular examples, rather than the quality shared by all examples. "Platonism" and its theory of Forms (also known as 'theory of Ideas;) denies the reality of the material world, considering it only an image or copy of the real world. According to this theory of Forms, there are these two kinds of things: the apparent world of material objects grasped by the senses, which constantly changes, and an unchanging and unseen world of Forms, grasped by reason. Plato's Forms represent types of things, as well as properties, patterns, and relations, to which we refer as objects. Just as individual tables, chairs, and cars refer to objects in this world, 'tableness', 'chairness', and 'carness', as well as e. g. justice, truth, and beauty refer to objects in another world. One of Plato's most cited examples for the Forms were the truths of geometry, such as the Pythagorean theorem. The theory of Forms is first introduced in the Phaedo dialogue (also known as On the Soul), wherein Socrates disputes the pluralism of Anaxagoras, then the most popular response to Heraclitus and Parmenides.

The soul 

For Plato, as was characteristic of ancient Greek philosophy, the soul was that which gave life. Plato advocates a belief in the immortality of the soul, and several dialogues end with long speeches imagining the afterlife. In the Timaeus, Socrates locates the parts of the soul within the human body: Reason is located in the head, spirit in the top third of the torso, and the appetite in the middle third of the torso, down to the navel.

Furthermore, Plato evinces a belief in the theory of reincarnation in multiple dialogues (such as the Phaedo and Timaeus). Scholars debate whether he intends the theory to be literally true, however. He uses this idea of reincarnation to introduce the concept that knowledge is a matter of recollection of things acquainted with before one is born, and not of observation or study. Keeping with the theme of admitting his own ignorance, Socrates regularly complains of his forgetfulness. In the Meno, Socrates uses a geometrical example to expound Plato's view that knowledge in this latter sense is acquired by recollection. Socrates elicits a fact concerning a geometrical construction from a slave boy, who could not have otherwise known the fact (due to the slave boy's lack of education). The knowledge must be of, Socrates concludes, an eternal, non-perceptible Form.

Epistemology 

Plato also discusses several aspects of epistemology. In several dialogues, Socrates inverts the common man's intuition about what is knowable and what is real. Reality is unavailable to those who use their senses. Socrates says that he who sees with his eyes is blind. While most people take the objects of their senses to be real if anything is, Socrates is contemptuous of people who think that something has to be graspable in the hands to be real. In the Theaetetus, he says such people are eu amousoi (εὖ ἄμουσοι), an expression that means literally, "happily without the muses". In other words, such people are willingly ignorant, living without divine inspiration and access to higher insights about reality. Many have interpreted Plato as stating — even having been the first to write — that knowledge is justified true belief, an influential view that informed future developments in epistemology. Plato also identified problems with the justified true belief definition in the Theaetetus, concluding that justification (or an "account") would require knowledge of difference, meaning that the definition of knowledge is circular.

In the Sophist, Statesman, Republic, Timaeus, and the Parmenides, Plato associates knowledge with the apprehension of unchanging Forms and their relationships to one another (which he calls "expertise" in dialectic), including through the processes of collection and division. More explicitly, Plato himself argues in the Timaeus that knowledge is always proportionate to the realm from which it is gained. In other words, if one derives one's account of something experientially, because the world of sense is in flux, the views therein attained will be mere opinions. Meanwhile, opinions are characterized by a lack of necessity and stability. On the other hand, if one derives one's account of something by way of the non-sensible Forms, because these Forms are unchanging, so too is the account derived from them. That apprehension of Forms is required for knowledge may be taken to cohere with Plato's theory in the Theaetetus and Meno. Indeed, the apprehension of Forms may be at the base of the account required for justification, in that it offers foundational knowledge which itself needs no account, thereby avoiding an infinite regression.

Ethics 

Several dialogues discuss ethics including virtue and vice, pleasure and pain, crime and punishment, and justice and medicine.  Socrates presents the famous Euthyphro dilemma in the dialogue of the same name: "Is the pious (τὸ ὅσιον) loved by the gods because it is pious, or is it pious because it is loved by the gods?" (10a) In the Protagoras dialogue it is argued through Socrates that virtue is innate and cannot be learned, that no one does bad on purpose, and to know what is good results in doing what is good; that knowledge is virtue. In the Republic, Plato poses the question, “What is justice?” and by examining both individual justice and the justice that informs societies, Plato is able not only to inform metaphysics, but also ethics and politics with the question: “What is the basis of moral and social obligation?” Plato's well-known answer rests upon the fundamental responsibility to seek wisdom, wisdom which leads to an understanding of the Form of the Good. Plato views "The Good" as the supreme Form, somehow existing even "beyond being". In this manner, justice is obtained when knowledge of how to fulfill one's moral and political function in society is put into practice.

Politics 

The dialogues also discuss politics. Some of Plato's most famous doctrines are contained in the Republic as well as in the Laws and the Statesman. Because these opinions are not spoken directly by Plato and vary between dialogues, they cannot be straightforwardly assumed as representing Plato's own views. 

Socrates asserts that societies have a tripartite class structure corresponding to the appetite/spirit/reason structure of the individual soul. The appetite/spirit/reason are analogous to the castes of society.
 Productive (Workers) – the labourers, carpenters, plumbers, masons, merchants, farmers, ranchers, etc. These correspond to the "appetite" part of the soul.
 Protective (Warriors or Guardians) – those who are adventurous, strong and brave; in the armed forces. These correspond to the "spirit" part of the soul.
 Governing (Rulers or Philosopher Kings) – those who are intelligent, rational, self-controlled, in love with wisdom, well suited to make decisions for the community. These correspond to the "reason" part of the soul and are very few.

According to Socrates, a state made up of different kinds of souls will, overall, decline from an aristocracy (rule by the best) to a timocracy (rule by the honourable), then to an oligarchy (rule by the few), then to a democracy (rule by the people), and finally to tyranny (rule by one person, rule by a tyrant).

Rhetoric and poetry 
Several dialogues tackle questions about art, including rhetoric and rhapsody. Socrates says that poetry is inspired by the muses, and is not rational. He speaks approvingly of this, and other forms of divine madness (drunkenness, eroticism, and dreaming) in the Phaedrus, and yet in the Republic wants to outlaw Homer's great poetry, and laughter as well. Scholars often view Plato's philosophy as at odds with rhetoric due to his criticisms of rhetoric in the Gorgias and his ambivalence toward rhetoric expressed in the Phaedrus. But other contemporary researchers contest the idea that Plato despised rhetoric and instead view his dialogues as a dramatization of complex rhetorical principles.Plato made abundant use of mythological narratives in his own work; It is generally agreed that the main purpose for Plato in using myths was didactic. He considered that only a few people were capable or interested in following a reasoned philosophical discourse, but men in general are attracted by stories and tales. Consequently, then, he used the myth to convey the conclusions of the philosophical reasoning. Notable examples include the story of Atlantis, the Myth of Er, and the Allegory of the Cave.

Works

Themes 

Plato never presents himself as a participant in any of the dialogues, and with the exception of the Apology, there is no suggestion that he heard any of the dialogues firsthand. Some dialogues have no narrator but have a pure "dramatic" form, some dialogues are narrated by Socrates himself, who speaks in the first person. The Symposium is narrated by Apollodorus, a Socratic disciple, apparently to Glaucon. Apollodorus assures his listener that he is recounting the story, which took place when he himself was an infant, not from his own memory, but as remembered by Aristodemus, who told him the story years ago.  The Theaetetus is also a peculiar case: a dialogue in dramatic form embedded within another dialogue in dramatic form. Some scholars take this as an indication that Plato had by this date wearied of the narrated form. In most of the dialogues, the primary speaker is Socrates, who employs a method of questioning which proceeds by a dialogue form called dialectic. The role of dialectic in Plato's thought is contested but there are two main interpretations: a type of reasoning and a method of intuition. Simon Blackburn adopts the first, saying that Plato's dialectic is "the process of eliciting the truth by means of questions aimed at opening out what is already implicitly known, or at exposing the contradictions and muddles of an opponent's position." Karl Popper, on the other hand, claims that dialectic is the art of intuition for "visualising the divine originals, the Forms or Ideas, of unveiling the Great Mystery behind the common man's everyday world of appearances."

Textual sources and history 

During the early Renaissance, the Greek language and, along with it, Plato's texts were reintroduced to Western Europe by Byzantine scholars. Some 250 known manuscripts of Plato survive. In September or October 1484 Filippo Valori and Francesco Berlinghieri printed 1025 copies of Ficino's translation, using the printing press at the Dominican convent S.Jacopo di Ripoli. The 1578 edition of Plato's complete works published by Henricus Stephanus (Henri Estienne) in Geneva also included parallel Latin translation and running commentary by Joannes Serranus (Jean de Serres). It was this edition which established standard Stephanus pagination, still in use today. The text of Plato as received today apparently represents the complete written philosophical work of Plato, based on the first century AD arrangement of Thrasyllus of Mendes.   The modern standard complete English edition is the 1997 Hackett Plato, Complete Works, edited by John M. Cooper.

Authenticity 
Thirty-five dialogues and thirteen letters (the Epistles) have traditionally been ascribed to Plato, though modern scholarship doubts the authenticity of at least some of these. Jowett mentions in his Appendix to Menexenus, that works which bore the character of a writer were attributed to that writer even when the actual author was unknown. 
The works taken as genuine in antiquity but are now doubted by at least some modern scholars are: Alcibiades I (*), Alcibiades II (‡), Clitophon (*), Epinomis (‡), Letters (*), Hipparchus (‡), Menexenus (*), Minos (‡), Lovers (‡), Theages (‡)
The following works were transmitted under Plato's name in antiquity, but were already considered spurious by the 1st century AD: Axiochus, Definitions, Demodocus, Epigrams, Eryxias, Halcyon, On Justice, On Virtue, Sisyphus.

Chronology 
No one knows the exact order Plato's dialogues were written in, nor the extent to which some might have been later revised and rewritten. The works are usually grouped into Early (sometimes by some into Transitional), Middle, and Late period; The following represents one relatively common division. 

Early: Apology, Charmides, Crito, Euthyphro, Gorgias, Hippias Minor, Hippias Major, Ion, Laches, Lysis, Protagoras
Middle: Cratylus, Euthydemus, Meno, Parmenides, Phaedo, Phaedrus, Republic, Symposium, Theatetus
Late: Critias, Sophist, Statesman, Timaeus, Philebus, Laws.

Whereas those classified as "early dialogues" often conclude in aporia, the so-called "middle dialogues" provide more clearly stated positive teachings that are often ascribed to Plato such as the theory of Forms. The remaining dialogues are classified as "late" and are generally agreed to be difficult and challenging pieces of philosophy. It should, however, be kept in mind that many of the positions in the ordering are still highly disputed, and also that the very notion that Plato's dialogues can or should be "ordered" is by no means universally accepted, though Plato's works are still often characterized as falling at least roughly into three groups stylistically.

Legacy

Unwritten doctrines 

Plato's unwritten doctrines are, according to some ancient sources, the most fundamental metaphysical teaching of Plato, which he disclosed only orally, and some say only to his most trusted fellows, and which he may have kept secret from the public, although many modern scholars doubt these claims. A reason for not revealing it to everyone is partially discussed in Phaedrus where Plato criticizes the written transmission of knowledge as faulty, favouring instead the spoken logos: "he who has knowledge of the just and the good and beautiful ... will not, when in earnest, write them in ink, sowing them through a pen with words, which cannot defend themselves by argument and cannot teach the truth effectually." It is, however, said that Plato once disclosed this knowledge to the public in his lecture On the Good, in which the Good is identified with the One (the Unity), the fundamental ontological principle. 

The first witness who mentions its existence is Aristotle, who in his Physics writes: "It is true, indeed, that the account he gives there [i.e. in Timaeus] of the participant is different from what he says in his so-called unwritten teachings." In Metaphysics he writes: "Now since the Forms are the causes of everything else, he [i.e. Plato] supposed that their elements are the elements of all things. Accordingly, the material principle is the Great and Small [i.e. the Dyad], and the essence is the One, since the numbers are derived from the Great and Small by participation in the One". "From this account it is clear that he only employed two causes: that of the essence, and the material cause; for the Forms are the cause of the essence in everything else, and the One is the cause of it in the Forms. He also tells us what the material substrate is of which the Forms are predicated in the case of sensible things, and the One in that of the Forms—that it is this the duality (the Dyad), the Great and Small. Further, he assigned to these two elements respectively the causation of good and of evil".

The most important aspect of this interpretation of Plato's metaphysics is the continuity between his teaching and the Neoplatonic interpretation of Plotinus{{efn|Plotinus describes this in the last part of his final Ennead (VI, 9) entitled On the Good, or the One. Jens Halfwassen states in Der Aufstieg zum Einen'] (2006) that "Plotinus' ontology—which should be called Plotinus' henology—is a rather accurate philosophical renewal and continuation of Plato's unwritten doctrine, i.e. the doctrine rediscovered by Krämer and Gaiser."}} or Ficino which has been considered erroneous by many but may in fact have been directly influenced by oral transmission of Plato's doctrine. A modern scholar who recognized the importance of the unwritten doctrine of Plato was Heinrich Gomperz who described it in his speech during the 7th International Congress of Philosophy in 1930. All the sources related to the  have been collected by Konrad Gaiser and published as Testimonia Platonica.
 Modern reception 

Plato's thought is often compared with that of his most famous student, Aristotle, whose reputation during the Western Middle Ages so completely eclipsed that of Plato that the Scholastic philosophers referred to Aristotle as "the Philosopher". The only Platonic work known to western scholarship was Timaeus, until translations were made after the fall of Constantinople, which occurred during 1453. However, the study of Plato continued in the Byzantine Empire, the Caliphates during the Islamic Golden Age, and Spain during Golden age of Jewish culture. During the early Islamic era, Persian, Arab, and Jewish scholars translated much of Plato into Arabic and wrote commentaries and interpretations on Plato's, Aristotle's and other Platonist philosophers' works (see Al-Kindi, Al-Farabi, Avicenna, Averroes, Hunayn ibn Ishaq). Plato is also referenced by Jewish philosopher and Talmudic scholar Maimonides in his The Guide for the Perplexed. Many of these commentaries on Plato were translated from Arabic into Latin and as such influenced Medieval scholastic philosophers.  

During the Renaissance, George Gemistos Plethon brought Plato's original writings to Florence from Constantinople in the century of its fall. Many of the greatest early modern scientists and artists who broke with Scholasticism, with the support of the Plato-inspired Lorenzo (grandson of Cosimo), saw Plato's philosophy as the basis for progress in the arts and sciences. The 17th century Cambridge Platonists, sought to reconcile Plato's more problematic beliefs, such as metempsychosis and polyamory, with Christianity. By the 19th century, Plato's reputation was restored, and at least on par with Aristotle's. Plato's influence has been especially strong in mathematics and the sciences. Plato's resurgence further inspired some of the greatest advances in logic since Aristotle, primarily through Gottlob Frege. Albert Einstein suggested that the scientist who takes philosophy seriously would have to avoid systematization and take on many different roles, and possibly appear as a Platonist or Pythagorean, in that such a one would have "the viewpoint of logical simplicity as an indispensable and effective tool of his research." 

 Criticism 
Many recent philosophers have also diverged from what some would describe as ideals characteristic of traditional Platonism. Friedrich Nietzsche notoriously attacked Plato's "idea of the good itself" along with many fundamentals of Christian morality, which he interpreted as "Platonism for the masses" in Beyond Good and Evil (1886). Martin Heidegger argued against Plato's alleged obfuscation of Being in his incomplete tome, Being and Time (1927), and the philosopher of science Karl Popper argued in the first volume of The Open Society and Its Enemies (1945) that Plato's alleged proposal for a utopian political regime in the Republic was prototypically totalitarian. Edmund Gettier famously demonstrated the problems of the justified true belief account of knowledge. That the modern theory of justified true belief as knowledge, which Gettier addresses, is equivalent to Plato's is accepted by some scholars but rejected by others.

 Notes 

 References 

 Works cited 
Primary sources (Greek and Roman)

 Apuleius, De Dogmate Platonis, I. See original text in Latin Library.
 Aristophanes, The Wasps. See original text in Perseus program.
 Aristotle, Metaphysics. See original text in Perseus program.
 Cicero, De Divinatione, I. See original text in Latin library.
 
  See original text in Perseus program.
  See original text in Perseus program.
  republished by: 
  See original text in Perseus program.
  See original text in Perseus program.
  See original text in Latin Library.
 , V, VIII. See original text in Perseus program.
 Xenophon, Memorabilia. See original text in Perseus program.

Secondary sources

 
 
 
 
 
 
 
 
 
 
 
 
 
 
 
 
 
 
 
 
 
 
 
 
 
 
 
 
 
 
  First published as "Testimonia Platonica. Quellentexte zur Schule und mündlichen Lehre Platons" as an appendix to Gaiser's Platons Ungeschriebene Lehre, Stuttgart, 1963.
  Reprinted in Gomperz, H. (1953). Philosophical Studies. Boston: Christopher Publishing House 1953, pp. 119–124.
 
 
 
 
 
 
 
 
 
 
 
 
 
 
 
 
 
 
 
 
 
 
 
 
 
 
 
 
 
 
 
 
 
 
 
 
 
 
 
 
 
 
 
 
 
 
 
 

 Further reading 

 
 Allen, R. E. (1965). Studies in Plato's Metaphysics II. Taylor & Francis. 
 Ambuel, David (2007). Image and Paradigm in Plato's Sophist. Parmenides Publishing. 
 
 Arieti, James A. Interpreting Plato: The Dialogues as Drama, Rowman & Littlefield Publishers, Inc. 
 
 
 Corlett, J. Angelo (2005). Interpreting Plato's Dialogues. Parmenides Publishing. 
 
 Fine, Gail (2000). Plato 1: Metaphysics and Epistemology Oxford University Press, US, 
 Finley, M.I. (1969). Aspects of antiquity: Discoveries and Controversies The Viking Press, Inc., US
 
 Guthrie, W.K.C. (1986). A History of Greek Philosophy (Plato – The Man & His Dialogues – Earlier Period), Cambridge University Press, 
 Guthrie, W.K.C. (1986). A History of Greek Philosophy (Later Plato & the Academy) Cambridge University Press, 
 Havelock, Eric (2005). Preface to Plato (History of the Greek Mind), Belknap Press, 
 
 Harvard University Press publishes the hardbound series Loeb Classical Library, containing Plato's works in Greek, with English translations on facing pages.
  
 Hermann, Arnold (2010). Plato's Parmenides: Text, Translation & Introductory Essay, Parmenides Publishing, 
 Irwin, Terence (1995). Plato's Ethics, Oxford University Press, US, 
 
 
 

 Lilar, Suzanne (1954), Journal de l'analogiste, Paris, Éditions Julliard; Reedited 1979, Paris, Grasset. Foreword by Julien Gracq
 Lilar, Suzanne (1963), Le couple, Paris, Grasset. Translated as Aspects of Love in Western Society in 1965, with a foreword by Jonathan Griffin London, Thames and Hudson.
 Lilar, Suzanne (1967) A propos de Sartre et de l'amour , Paris, Grasset.
 
 Márquez, Xavier (2012) A Stranger's Knowledge: Statesmanship, Philosophy & Law in Plato's Statesman, Parmenides Publishing. 
 
 Miller, Mitchell (2004). The Philosopher in Plato's Statesman. Parmenides Publishing. 
 Mohr, Richard D. (2006). God and Forms in Plato – and other Essays in Plato's Metaphysics. Parmenides Publishing. 
 Mohr, Richard D. (Ed.), Sattler, Barbara M. (Ed.) (2010) One Book, The Whole Universe: Plato's Timaeus Today, Parmenides Publishing. 
 Moore, Edward (2007). Plato. Philosophy Insights Series. Tirril, Humanities-Ebooks. 
 Nightingale, Andrea Wilson. (1995). "Genres in Dialogue: Plato and the Construct of Philosophy", Cambridge University Press. 
 Oxford University Press publishes scholarly editions of Plato's Greek texts in the Oxford Classical Texts series, and some translations in the Clarendon Plato Series.
 Patterson, Richard (Ed.), Karasmanis, Vassilis (Ed.), Hermann, Arnold (Ed.) (2013) Presocratics & Plato: Festschrift at Delphi in Honor of Charles Kahn, Parmenides Publishing. 
 
 
 
 Sayre, Kenneth M. (2005). Plato's Late Ontology: A Riddle Resolved. Parmenides Publishing. 
 Seung, T.K. (1996). Plato Rediscovered: Human Value and Social Order. Rowman and Littlefield. 
 
 Stewart, John. (2010). Kierkegaard and the Greek World – Socrates and Plato. Ashgate. 
 Thesleff, Holger (2009). Platonic Patterns: A Collection of Studies by Holger Thesleff, Parmenides Publishing, 
 Vlastos, Gregory (1981). Platonic Studies, Princeton University Press, 
 Vlastos, Gregory (2006). Plato's Universe – with a new Introduction by Luc Brisson, Parmenides Publishing. 
 Zuckert, Catherine (2009). Plato's Philosophers: The Coherence of the Dialogues, The University of Chicago Press, 

 External links 

 Works available online:
 
  – Greek & English hyperlinked text
 
 
 
 [http://www.iep.utm.edu/plato/ Internet Encyclopedia of Philosophy Stanford Encyclopedia of Philosophy''
 Other resources:
 
 
 

 
 Plato
420s BC births
340s BC deaths
5th-century BC Greek people
5th-century BC writers
4th-century BC Greek people
4th-century BC philosophers
4th-century BC writers
Academic philosophers
Ancient Athenian philosophers
Ancient Greek epistemologists
Ancient Greek ethicists
Ancient Greek logicians
Ancient Greek metaphysicians
Ancient Greek philosophers of mind
Ancient Greek physicists
Ancient Greek political philosophers
Ancient Greek philosophers of art
Ancient Greek philosophers of language
Ancient Greek slaves and freedmen
Ancient Syracuse
Attic Greek writers
Epigrammatists of the Greek Anthology
Idealists
Logicians
Moral realists
Natural philosophers
Ontologists
Philosophers of education
Philosophers of love
Pupils of Socrates
Rationalists
Theorists on Western civilization
Philosophers of death
Natural law ethicists